Nikolai Lvovich Baglei (25 February 1937 – 3 March 1991) was a Ukrainian basketball player. Playing for the Soviet team he won a silver medal at the 1964 Summer Olympics, as well as gold medals at EuroBasket 1965 and Summer Universiades of 1959 and 1961. Since his death in 1991, an annual international basketball tournament is carried out in Kyiv in his honor.

References

1937 births
1991 deaths
Basketball players from Kyiv
Ukrainian men's basketball players
Soviet men's basketball players
Olympic basketball players of the Soviet Union
Basketball players at the 1964 Summer Olympics
Olympic silver medalists for the Soviet Union
Olympic medalists in basketball
Medalists at the 1964 Summer Olympics
Universiade medalists in basketball
Universiade gold medalists for the Soviet Union
Burevestnik (sports society) athletes
Medalists at the 1959 Summer Universiade
Medalists at the 1961 Summer Universiade